Lili Cassel-Wronker (5 May 1924 – 10 January 2019) was a Jewish children books illustrator and calligrapher and one of the founder of the Society of Scribes.

Biography 
Born in Berlin, Germany, Cassel-Wronker and her family fled the Nazi Regime in 1938 and immigrated to the United States in 1940, settling in New York. She studied art at Washington Irving High School. the Art Students League and the Brooklyn Museum Art School. She first worked at Time Magazine. She illustrated her first children's book, The Rainbow Mother Goose, in 1947. It was described by the American Institute of Graphic Arts (AIGA) as one of the "Fifty Best Books of the Year". She later taught calligraphy at the New School.

In 1952, she married Erich Wronker, of the family previously owning the German chain of stores Hermann Wronker AG, with whom she would later run a publication press from home.

Published works 

 Illustrations of The Rainbow Mother Goose, 1947

Notes and references 

1924 births
2019 deaths
American illustrators
Jewish emigrants from Nazi Germany to the United States
People from Berlin
Women calligraphers